Jaipur House is the former residence of the Maharaja of Jaipur in the city of New Delhi, India. It is situated at the end of Rajpath, facing the India Gate.

History 
It was designed by Charles Blomfield, after construction of Lutyens' Delhi, in 1936.

Today it houses the National Gallery of Modern Art (NGMA), India's premier art gallery which was established here by Ministry of Culture in 1954.

Architecture 
The structure has a butterfly layout and a central dome. The structure is clad in red and yellow sandstone. To the back of the palace is a large garden, which can be entered through the main ballroom on the ground floor. The ballroom is paneled in dark wood.

Inside is the main hall underneath the central dome, with a large spiral staircase leading to the upper floor.

See also 
 Hyderabad House
 Bikaner House
 Baroda House
 Patiala House
 Jodhpur House

References

Further reading

External links 

 Image of the Jaipur House

Royal residences in Delhi
History of Jaipur
Buildings and structures completed in 1936
20th-century architecture in India